Bogus Hill is a census-designated place (CDP) in the town of New Fairfield, Fairfield County, Connecticut, United States. It is in the northeast part of the town, on a hill of the same name occupying a peninsula in Candlewood Lake. It is bordered to the southwest, across Squantz Cove, by Knollcrest.

Bogus Hill was first listed as a CDP prior to the 2020 census.

References 

Census-designated places in Fairfield County, Connecticut
Census-designated places in Connecticut